An honor cord is a token consisting of twisted cords with tassels on either end awarded to members of honor societies or for various academic and non-academic achievements, awards, or honors.  Usually, cords come in pairs with a knot in the middle to hold them together.  Sometimes sashes, stoles, or medallions are given in place of cords.  They are most often worn at academic ceremonies and functions.  With cap and gown, and (sometimes) the hood, high school or university degree candidates have worn these cords at the discretion of the educational institution, but they are not usually worn with academic regalia after the academic year in which the honor was awarded. Unlike hoods and stoles, by tradition more than one cord may be worn at the same time.

At some universities, pairs of honor cords, in the school colors, indicate honors graduates: one pair for cum laude, two pairs for magna cum laude, and three pairs for summa cum laude. These are in addition to any cords for membership in an honor society.

List of collegiate honor societies and the color of their cords
(Mostly taken from The Association of College Honor Societies)

List of high school honor societies and the color of their cords

See also
 Association of College Honor Societies

References

Academic dress
School terminology